Big Brother Mzansi: Double Trouble (also known as Big Brother Mzansi 2 or Big Brother South Africa 4) is the second season of the South African Big Brother reality television reboot series produced by Endemol for M-Net and Mzansi Magic. The launch was divided in two nights, being the dates 22 March and 23 March 2015 and concluded on 18 May 2015 when the couple, Ace and Ntombi have crowned the winners with Blue and K2 were the runner-ups. The show was hosted by Lungile Radu again. The season lasted 56 days, making it the shortest South African Big Brother.

Housemates

Twists

Pairs 
On Day 1, each housemate entered the house with another housemate whom they had already a relationship with before entering the show. The pairs were:
 Bongi & Khali, dating for 3 months
 Bexx & Soxx, cousins
 Tembi & Adams, former couple
 Tiffini & Gino, sister & brother
 Ntombi & Ace, dating for 5 years

However, on Day 2, the second part of the launch, the pairs selected had no previous relationships.

After the expulsion of Adams and the removal of Bexx from the Big Brother Mzansi house on Day 23, their respective partners Tembi and Soxx were asked if they wanted to leave with them or not. Both decided to stay, meaning Soxx and Tembi became an official pair in the game.

Nomination History

Notes 

 Ex answered the red telephone and Biggie ordered him to exit the house with Lebo in tow. Once on stage, the pair was given an ultimatum - it was either they take R100 000.00 and exit the game or they reject it and stay in the running for the ultimate R2 Million prize. They decided to exit the game after some talk.
 Blue & K2 won immunity in the Friday Night Games. The nominations were divided in two rounds: the first one was on Sunday, in which each housemate nominated a pair and the second one was on Monday, in which each pair nominated another pair. The results were added, and Gino & Tiffini and Matthias & Sibu were the initial nominees. Then Blue & K2 won the HoH and decided to save Gino & Tiffini and replaced them with Bongi & Khali. The public voted to save a single housemate and not a pair.
 The nominations were again divided in two rounds: the first one was on Sunday, in which each housemate nominated a pair and the second one was on Monday, in which each pair nominated another pair. The results were added, and Adams & Tembi, Chelsea & Mbali and Gino & Tiffini were the initial nominees. Then Kay & Pumba won the HoH and decided to save Adams & Tembi and replaced them with Bexx & Soxx. The public voted to save a single housemate and not a pair.
 Due to the expulsion of Adams and removal of Bexx this week's nominations were null and void thus the evictions was cancelled. Chelsea and Mbali still remained Heads of House for the week.
 The nominations were again divided in two rounds: the first one, in which each housemate nominated a pair and the second one, in which each pair nominated another pair. However, this time the nominations were done face-to-face during the live show. The results were added, and Blue & K2, Chelsea & Mbali, Kay & Pumba and Ace & Ntombi were the initial nominees. Then Soxx & Tembi won the HoH and decided to save Chelsea & Mbali and replaced them with Bongi & Khali. However, Blue & K2 had a power of nomination dagger, and with it put Chelsea & Mbali on the nominations again. The public voted to save a single housemate and not a pair.
 As this was NonSense Week (Fake Week) everything that happened from Monday to Friday were null and void. On Friday, housemates competed in HoH challenge which Soxx & Tembi won thus giving them immunity from eviction. Big Brother then nominated all the other housemates for possible eviction on Sunday.
 The nominations were again divided in two rounds: the first one, in which each housemate nominated a pair and the second one, in which each pair nominated another pair. The results were added, and Chelsea & Mbali and Soxx & Tembi received the most nominations, being nominated. As Blue & K2 won HoH, it didn't affect the nominations.

Nominations: Results

External links 
 

South Africa
2015 South African television seasons